Bahrs Scrub is an urban locality in the City of Logan, Queensland, Australia.

Geography
Bahrs Scrub consists predominantly of acreage blocks although recent developments have been of higher density.

The Beaudesert–Beenleigh Road runs along the eastern boundary.

History
As the name suggests, the area was originally scrub land. The origin of the name is less clear. It has been attributed to early German settlers, Carl Wilhelm Bahr and his son, Wilhelm Bahr. The earliest references to the location call it Jimmybark Scrub and the nearby hill Bark Hill (now Bahrs Hill), so the current names may be a corruption of these.

Bahr's Scrub State School opened circa July 1919. It closed in 1929 due to low student numbers.

Windaroo Valley State High School opened on 1 January 1994.

The median age of the Bahrs Scrub population was 32 years, 5 years below the national median of 37.  73.9% of people living in Bahrs Scrub were born in Australia. The other top responses for country of birth were New Zealand 6.3%, England 5.1%, South Africa 1.1%, Netherlands 1%, Zimbabwe 0.7%.  88.9% of people spoke only English at home; the next most common languages were 0.7% Russian, 0.6% Afrikaans, 0.5% Dutch, 0.5% Hungarian, 0.5% Mandarin.

Education 
Windaroo Valley State High School is a government secondary (7-12) school for boys and girls at 240 Beaudesert Beenleigh Road. In 2017, the school had an enrolment of 1115 students with 94 teachers (91 full-time equivalent) and 42 non-teaching staff (30 full-time equivalent). It includes a special education program.

References

External links

 
 
 Logan City map

Suburbs of Logan City
Localities in Queensland